Pléneuf-Val-André (Gallo: Ploenoec) is a commune in the Côtes-d'Armor department of Brittany in northwestern France. The writer Florian Le Roy (1901–1959), winner of the 1947 Prix Cazes was born in Pléneuf-Val-André and the journalist Yves Grosrichard (1907–1992) died there too.

Geography
Pléneuf-Val-André lies 25 km east of Saint-Brieuc and 13 km north of Lamballe.

Population

People from Pléneuf-Val-André are called pléneuviens or valandréens in French.

Notable people
 Félix Gautier, port master of Dahouët, Knight of the Legion of Honor and his son François Gautier (1832-1918), shipowner, builder of the Pourquoi-Pas?, close friend of Charcot.
 Léonard Victor Charner (1797-1869), Admiral of France: in 1857 he built a manor house with chapel and guardhouse on land then close to the dunes but which would later be in the heart of Val-André. One of the main streets bears his name and its heritage became, by purchase in 1954, the Admiralty Park.
 The poet Jean Richepin (1849-1926) built the villa La Carrière and is buried in the commune. The public college of Pléneuf bears his name.
 Frédéric Henri Le Normand de Lourmel (1811-1854), brigadier general, fell in front of Sébastopol on November 5, 1854,and was buried on December 20 in the cemetery of Pléneuf.
 Joseph Édouard de La Motte-Rouge (1804-1883), general, born in the Bellevue house located in the village.
 Philippe Gavi, co-founder of the newspaper Liberation with Jean-Paul Sartre and Serge July.
 Pierre-Yvon Lenoir (1936-2015), French athlete, died in the town.
 Charlotte Valandrey (1968-2022), actress, chose her pseudonym in reference to the town, and is buried there.
 Fabrice Jeandesboz, professional cyclist.
 Patrick de Gmeline, military historian, laureate of the French Academy.
 Gustave Téry, journalist, founder of the newspaper L'Œuvre (buried in the commune).
 Raoul Ponchon, writer, poet, member of the Goncourt Academy (buried in the commune).
 André Cornu (politician), Secretary of State (buried in the commune).
 Simone Gallimard, French publisher (buried in the commune).

See also
Communes of the Côtes-d'Armor department

References

Gallery

External links

Official website 

Communes of Côtes-d'Armor
Seaside resorts in France